Un nulla pieno di storie (A Void Full of Stories) is an interview-autobiography by Sebastiano Vassalli with Giovanni Tesio. The book explores various themes, from religion to politics and also looks into the life of the author.

Plot 

Firstly he talks about his childhood, especially about his father whom he had a complicated relationship with, and about the aunts that reluctantly looked after him after his parents’ divorce.
Then the story deals with war and his experiences about it, such as when he was present at an execution of men suspected of being partisans and at a conversation where someone was talking about a certain Redimisto Fabbri, whose rebellion of his factory workers wasn't expected.
After that he talks about his school life, saying how he loved literature and nature, and mentioned his university professor who considered his graduation thesis very convincing although with a completely incorrect form. More generally, he defined himself as a lousy student but also as an impressive reader.

He tells about his life with his wife (that will only be addressed as L) that will later die of a serious illness, and with their adopted son. He expresses then his opinions on religion and God, asserting that the former is not necessary unlike the latter. 
He says he was born as a writer when his book La notte della cometa was published, also telling about the birth of the word. He affirms that the art of writing isn't only telling stories but also of telling one's self.
He narrates about the fact that a book of his (“Tempo di Massacro”) he didn't mean to do anything with was published by Italo Calvino because of how much he had liked it.

He admits having some faith in literature, even though quantity is searched more than quality, and in poetry in particular, which will return and its light will never go out. For him, the art of telling stories will always exist despite its growing uselessness.
Lastly he talks about the recurring themes in his books: death, vanitas and  ashes. He expresses his opinions especially on the first, taking the chance of using the interview as a sort of last will and testament, in which he says how he wants his funeral to be and he wishes for his ashes to be spread in his home where he will live his last years of his life.

References   

Italian autobiographies